Crassispira procera is a species of sea snail, a marine gastropod mollusk in the family Pseudomelatomidae.

Description
The length of the shell attains 15 mm.

Distribution
This marine species occurs off the Chesterfield Plateau, New Caledonia, the Coral Sea and the Philippines.

References

 Kantor Y.I., Stahlschmidt P., Aznar-Cormano L., Bouchet P. & Puillandre N. (2017). Too familiar to be questioned? Revisiting the Crassispira cerithina species complex (Gastropoda: Conoidea: Pseudomelatomidae). Journal of Molluscan Studies. 83 (1): 43-55

External links
 
 

procera
Gastropods described in 2017